Élder Alencar Machado de Campos  (born 19 July 1976), known as Élder Campos or just Élder, is a Brazilian football coach and former player who played as a midfielder. He is the current manager of Santos' under-17 team.

Club career
Élder played for Vasco, Santos, Juventude, Guarani and Criciúma in the Campeonato Brasileiro Série A. He also spent one season with Giannina and one with Kallithea in the Greek Super League. He later moved to Hungary where he played for Lombard-Pápa.

References

External links
Profile and statistics @ Conteudo Esportivo

1976 births
Living people
Brazilian footballers
Brazilian expatriate footballers
CR Vasco da Gama players
Santos FC players
Esporte Clube Juventude players
Guarani FC players
Criciúma Esporte Clube players
PAS Giannina F.C. players
Kallithea F.C. players
Lombard-Pápa TFC footballers
Expatriate footballers in Greece
Association football midfielders
Brazilian football managers
Associação Atlética Portuguesa (Santos) managers
Santos FC non-playing staff